Suk or SUK may refer to:

Places
Suk, Iran, a village in Bushehr Province
Suk Qazqan, a village in Markazi Province, Iran
Seh Suk, a village in Lorestan Province, Iran
Suk Samran District, a district of Ranong Province, Thailand
Santi Suk, Chiang Mai, a subdistrict of Doi Lo District, Thailand
Santi Suk, Chiang Rai, a subdistrict of Phan District, Thailand

Acronyms
 The ISO 639 language code for the Sukuma language
 The IATA airport code for the Sakkyryr Airport
 The ICAO airline code for the Superior Aviation Services of Kenya

Other
 Josef Suk (composer) (1874–1935), Czech composer and violinist
Suk Chamber Orchestra, named after composer
Josef Suk (violinist) (1929–2011), the composer's grandson, Czech violinist and conductor
Suk Trio, a Czech piano trio founded in 1951
Suk School, a fictional medical school in Frank Herbert's Dune universe
Suk tribe, Kenya

See also
Suk (name)
Suck (disambiguation)
souk, an open-air Arab marketplace